Caroline Scheufele, born in Pforzheim, Germany, is a German business woman. She is the artistic director and co-president of Chopard, the Swiss-based luxury watches and jewellery manufacturer. She is the daughter of Karl and Karin Scheufele, German entrepreneurs who purchased the company in 1963.
During the 1980s, Scheufele expanded the business into the jewelry sector.

In 1998, Scheufele redesigned the Palme d’Or for the Cannes Film Festival, and made Chopard an official event partner. Under her direction, the brand became one of the first to grow the market in sustainable luxury goods and ethical gold.

Biography

Childhood 
Caroline Scheufele was born in Pforzheim in Germany. Her parents managed the watchmaking company Eszeha, based in Pforzheim.

In 1963, her father Karl acquired the Geneva-based watch manufacturer Chopard, and over the following years, the family traveled back and forth between Germany and Switzerland.

At the age of 12, Caroline moved to Switzerland in order to study at Geneva’s International School along with her brother Karl-Friedrich. She decided to join the family business immediately after obtaining her diploma, while enrolled in classes in Design and Gemmology. She completed a year of further training at Eszeha, spending time in each of the company departments, including export, packaging, after-sales service, and others while continuing to work in the Design Department. Back in Geneva, she joined her brother’s office.

Launching of the jewelry side 
In 1985, she designed an articulated clown made of floating diamonds.

Her father put the piece into production. The clown was the first piece of jewelry made by Chopard and marked the company’s launch into this sector. From that time onward, the company developed the jewelry side of its business, later expanding into fine jewelry.

The Palme d'Or 
In 1997, Chopard opened a boutique in Cannes. Caroline Scheufele wanted to link the boutique’s opening to the festival. She headed to Paris to meet Pierre Viot, Director of the Cannes Film Festival. The Palme d’Or used to consist of a gold plated palm leaf resting on a Plexiglas pyramid. Its design had remained unchanged for 50 years. Pierre Viot invited her to redesign the award piece and she agreed. Scheufele redesigned the Palme d’Or for the Cannes Film Festival and made Chopard the official event partner from 1998 onwards. Since that time, the award has been manufactured within the company’s workshops.

2001: Co-Presidency 
In 2001, Caroline Scheufele and her brother Karl-Friedrich were named co-presidents of the company. Caroline is the artistic director in charge of fine jewelry, design and artwork, as well as perfume and accessories. Her brother is in charge of watches, innovation and business strategy. They jointly manage marketing, publicity and communications.

Scheufele is also in charge of international retail and travels the world to introduce the brand to other countries.

She has established partnerships with charitable organizations such as Elton John AIDS Foundation, The Prince’s Trust, the José Carreras Leukaemia Foundation, Petra Nemcova’s All Hands And Hearts - Smart Response, Natalia Vodianova’s Naked Heart Foundation, Sheikha Moza bint Nasser’s Education Above All, and the WWF.

Ethical gold 
Under the direction of Scheufele, Chopard has become one of the first brands to use raw materials that meet the highest possible social and environmental standards, and supports Fairmined certified responsible gold. In 2010, the brand joined the Responsible Jewellery Council (RJC), which sets out a code of good conduct and promotes responsible practices.

In 2011, Scheufele met Livia Firth, wife of actor Colin Firth, who is involved in sustainable development. As the founder of Green Carpet Challenge, Livia Firth encourages brands to invest in more ethical designs. Following their encounter, Scheufele created a collection made entirely from ethical gold certified by Fairmined and diamonds from certified members of the Responsible Jewellery Council. Fairmined gold is extracted from sustainable mines supported by the Alliance for Responsible Mining. Since 2014, the Palme d’Or has been made in Fairmined certified ethical gold.

Over time, Scheufele has forged partnerships and agreements with various players operating in the responsibly extracted ethical gold market and developed the production of sustainable jewelry and watches. As of 2018, all Chopard watches and jewelry are made in 100% ethical gold.

Record 
In 2015, Caroline Scheufele acquired one of the world’s largest and purest raw diamonds from a mine in Botswana on behalf of Chopard. She used this 342-carat diamond, known as the “Queen of Kalahari”, to create a high jewelry collection that was exhibited in Paris in 2018 and baptized “The Garden of Kalahari”.

References

External links 
  Sustainability is the future of higt jewellery by Alexandre Benoit for Cote Magazine, 3 août 2017 photographer 

Living people
20th-century German businesswomen
20th-century German businesspeople
People from Gstaad
Women business executives
German jewellery designers
German business executives
Perfumers
21st-century German businesswomen
21st-century German businesspeople
Year of birth missing (living people)